Novi Bolman is a settlement in the region of Baranja, Croatia. Administratively, it is located in the Jagodnjak municipality within the Osijek-Baranja County. Population is 122 people.

See also
Jagodnjak Municipality
Osijek-Baranja County
Baranja

References

Populated places in Osijek-Baranja County
Baranya (region)
Joint Council of Municipalities
Serb communities in Croatia